The Histories (also known as The History) of Herodotus is considered the founding work of history in Western literature. Written around 430 BC in the Ionic dialect of classical Greek, The Histories serves as a record of the ancient traditions, politics, geography, and clashes of various cultures that were known in Greece, Western Asia and Northern Africa at that time. Although not a fully impartial record, it remains one of the West's most important sources regarding these affairs. Moreover, it established the genre and study of history in the Western world (despite the existence of historical records and chronicles beforehand).

The Histories also stands as one of the earliest accounts of the rise of the Persian Empire, as well as the events and causes of the Greco-Persian Wars between the Persian Empire and the Greek city-states in the 5th century BC. Herodotus portrays the conflict as one between the forces of slavery (the Persians) on the one hand, and freedom (the Athenians and the confederacy of Greek city-states which united against the invaders) on the other. The Histories was at some point divided into the nine books that appear in modern editions, conventionally named after the nine Muses.

Motivation for writing
Herodotus claims to have traveled extensively around the ancient world, conducting interviews and collecting stories for his book, almost all of which covers territories of the Persian Empire. At the beginning of The Histories, Herodotus sets out his reasons for writing it:

Summary

Book I (Clio) 
The abductions of Io, Europa, and Medea, which motivated Paris to abduct Helen. The subsequent Trojan War is marked as a precursor to later conflicts between peoples of Asia and Europe.  (–5)
Colchis, Colchians and Medea. (1.2.2–1.2.3)
 The rulers of Lydia (on the west coast of Asia Minor, today modern Turkey): Candaules, Gyges, Ardys, Sadyattes, Alyattes, Croesus (–7)
How Candaules made his bodyguard, Gyges, view the naked body of his wife. Upon discovery, she ordered Gyges to murder Candaules or face death himself
 How Gyges took the kingdom from Candaules (–13)
 The singer Arion's ride on the dolphin (–24)
 Solon's answer to Croesus's question that Tellus was the happiest person in the world (–33)
 Croesus's efforts to protect his son Atys, his son's accidental death by Adrastus (–44)
 Croesus's test of the oracles (–54)
 The answer from the Oracle of Delphi concerning whether Croesus should attack the Persians (famous for its ambiguity): If you attack, a great empire will fall. 
 Peisistratos' rises and falls from power as tyrant of Athens (–64)
 The rise of Sparta (–68)

 A description the geographic location of several Anatolian tribes, including the Cappadocians, Matieni, Phrygians, and Paphlagonians.
 The Battle of Halys; Thales predicts the solar eclipse of May 28, 585 BC

 Croesus's defeat by Cyrus II of Persia, and how he later became Cyrus's advisor (–92)
 The Tyrrhenian's descent from the Lydians: "Then the one group, having drawn the lot, left the country and came down to Smyrna and built ships, in which they loaded all their goods that could be transported aboard ship, and sailed away to seek a livelihood and a country; until at last, after sojourning with one people after another, they came to the Ombrici, where they founded cities and have lived ever since. They no longer called themselves Lydians, but Tyrrhenians, after the name of the king's son who had led them there,".
 The rulers of the Medes: Deioces, Phraortes, Cyaxares, Astyages, Cyrus II of Persia (–144)
 The rise of Deioces over the Medes
Astyages's attempt to destroy Cyrus, and Cyrus's rise to power
Harpagus tricked into eating his son, his revenge against Astyages by assisting Cyrus
 The culture of the Persians
 The history and geography of the Ionians, and the attacks on it by Harpagus
Pactyes' convinces the Lydians to revolt. Rebellion fails and he seeks refuge from Mazares in Cyme (Aeolis)
 The culture of Assyria, especially the design and improvement of the city of Babylon and the ways of its people
 Cyrus's attack on Babylon, including his revenge on the river Gyndes and his famous method for entering the city
 Cyrus's ill-fated attack on the Massagetæ, leading to his death

Book II (Euterpe) 

 The proof of the antiquity of the Phrygians by the use of children unexposed to language
 The geography, customs, and history of Egypt (Sections 2–182)
 Speculations on the Nile river (Sections 2-34)
 The religious practices of Egypt, especially as they differ from the Greeks (sections 35–64)
 The animals of Egypt: cats, dogs, crocodiles, hippopotamuses, otters, phoenixes, sacred serpents, winged snakes, ibises
 The culture of Egypt: medicine, funeral rites, food, boats
 The kings of Egypt: Menes, Nitocris, Mœris, Sesostris, Pheron, Proteus
 Helen and Paris's stay in Egypt, just before the Trojan War (–120) 
 More kings of Egypt: Rhampsinit (and the story of the clever thief), Cheops (and the building of the Great Pyramid of Giza using machines), Chephren, Mycerinus, Asychis and the Ethiopian conqueror Sabacos, Anysis, Sethos
 The line of priests
 The Labyrinth
 More kings of Egypt: the twelve, Psammetichus (and his rise to power), Necôs, Psammis, Apries, Amasis II (and his rise to power)

Book III (Thalia) 
 Cambyses II of Persia's (son of Cyrus II and king of Persia) attack on Egypt, and the defeat of the Egyptian king Psammetichus III.
 Cambyses's abortive attack on Ethiopia
 The madness of Cambyses
 The good fortune of Polycrates, king of Samos
 Periander, the king of Corinth and Corcyra, and his obstinate son
 The revolt of the two Magi in Persia and the death of Cambyses
 The conspiracy of the seven to remove the Magi
 The rise of Darius I of Persia.
 The twenty satrapies
 The culture of India and their method of collecting gold
 The culture of Arabia and their method of collecting spices
 The flooded valley with five gates
 Orœtes's (governor of Sardis) scheme against Polycrates
 The physician Democêdes
 The rise of Syloson governor of Samos
 The revolt of Babylon and its defeat by the scheme of Zopyrus

Book IV (Melpomene) 

 The history of the Scythians (from the land north of the Black Sea)
 The miraculous poet Aristeas
 The geography of Scythia
 The inhabitants of regions beyond Scythia: Sauromatae, Budini, Thyssagetae, Argippaeans, Issedones, Arimaspi, Hyperboreans
 A comparison of Libya (Africa), Asia, and Europe
 The rivers of Scythia: the Ister, the Tyras, the Hypanis, the Borysthenes, the Panticapes, the Hypacyris, the Gerrhus, and the Tanais
 The culture of the Scythians: religion, burial rites, xenophobia (the stories of Anacharsis and Scylas), population (sections 59–81)

 The beginning of Darius's attack on Scythia, including the pontoon bridge over the Bosphorus
 The brutal worship of Zalmoxis by the Getae
 The customs of the surrounding peoples: Tauri, Agathyrsi, Neuri, Androphagi (man-eaters), Melanchlaeni, Geloni, Budini, Sauromatae
 The wooing of the Amazons by the Scyths, forming the Sauromatae
 Darius's failed attack on Scythia and consequent retreat
 The story of the Minyæ (descendants of the Argonauts) and the founding of Cyrene
 The kings of Cyrene: Battus I, Arcesilaus I, Battus II, Arcesilaus II, Battus III (and the reforms of Demonax), Arcesilaus III (and his flight, restoration, and assassination), Battus IV, and Arcesilaus IV (his revolt and death)
 The peoples of Libya from east to west
 The revenge of Arcesilaus' mother Pheretima

Book V (Terpsichore) 
 The attack on the Thracians by Megabazus
 The removal of the Paeonians to Asia
 The slaughter of the Persian envoys by Alexander I of Macedon
 The failed attack on the Naxians by Aristagoras, tyrant of Miletus
 The revolt of Miletus against Persia
 The background of Cleomenes I, king of Sparta, and his half brother Dorieus
 The description of the Persian Royal Road from Sardis to Susa
 The introduction of writing to Greece by the Phoenicians
 The freeing of Athens by Sparta, and its subsequent attacks on Athens
 The reorganizing of the Athenian tribes by Cleisthenes
 The attack on Athens by the Thebans and Eginetans
 The backgrounds of the tyrants of Corinth Cypselus and his son Periander
 Aristagoras's failed request for help from Sparta, and successful attempt with Athens
 The burning of Sardis, and Darius's vow for revenge against the Athenians
 Persia's attempts to quell the Ionian revolt

Book VI (Erato) 

 The fleeing of Histiaeus to Chios
 The training of the Ionian fleet by Dionysius of Phocaea
 The abandonment of the Ionian fleet by the Samians during battle
 The defeat of the Ionian fleet by the Persians
 The capture and death of Histiaeus by Harpagus
 The invasion of Greek lands under Mardonius and enslavement of Macedon
 The destruction of 300 ships in Mardonius's fleet near Athos

 The order of Darius that the Greeks provide him earth and water, in which most consent, including Aegina
 The Athenian request for assistance of Cleomenes of Sparta in dealing with the traitors
 The history behind Sparta having two kings and their powers
 The dethronement of Demaratus, the other king of Sparta, due to his supposed false lineage
 The arrest of the traitors in Aegina by Cleomenes and the new king Leotychides
 The suicide of Cleomenes in a fit of madness, possibly caused by his war with Argos, drinking unmixed wine, or his involvement in dethroning Demaratus
 The battle between Aegina and Athens
 The taking of Eretria by the Persians after the Eretrians sent away Athenian help
 Pheidippides's encounter with the god Pan on a journey to Sparta to request aid
 The assistance of the Plataeans, and the history behind their alliance with Athens
 The Athenian win at the Battle of Marathon, led by Miltiades and other strategoi (This section starts roughly around 6.100)
 The Spartans late arrival to assist Athens
 The history of the Alcmaeonidae and how they came about their wealth and status
 The death of Miltiades after a failed attack on Paros and the successful taking of Lemnos

Book VII (Polymnia) 
 The amassing of an army by Darius after learning about the defeat at Marathon
 The quarrel between Ariabignes and Xerxes over which son should succeed Darius in which Xerxes is chosen (-3)
 The death of Darius in 486 BC
 The defeat of the Egyptian rebels by Xerxes
 The advice given to Xerxes on invading Greece: Mardonius for invasion, Artabanus against (-10)

 The dreams of Xerxes in which a phantom frightens him and Artabanus into choosing invasion
 The preparations for war, including building the Xerxes Canal and Xerxes' Pontoon Bridges across the Hellespont
 The offer by Pythius to give Xerxes all his money, in which Xerxes rewards him
 The request by Pythius to allow one son to stay at home, Xerxes's anger, and the march out between the butchered halves of Pythius's sons
 The destruction and rebuilding of the bridges built by the Egyptians and Phoenicians at Abydos
 The siding with Persia of many Greek states, including Thessaly, Thebes, Melia, and Argos
 The refusal of aid after negotiations by Gelo of Syracuse, and the refusal from Crete
 The destruction of 400 Persian ships due to a storm
 The small Greek force (approx. 7,000) led by Leonidas I, sent to Thermopylae to delay the Persian army (~5,283,220 (Herodotus) )
 The Battle of Thermopylae in which the Greeks hold the pass for 3 days
 The secret pass divulged by Ephialtes of Trachis, which Hydarnes uses to lead forces around the mountains to encircle the Greeks
 The retreat of all but the Spartans, Thespians, and Thebans (forced to stay by the Spartans).
 The Greek defeat and order by Xerxes to remove Leonidas's head and attach his torso to a cross

Book VIII (Urania) 
 Greek fleet is led by Eurybiades, a Spartan commander who led the Greek fleet after the meeting at the Isthmus 481 BC,
 The destruction by storm of two hundred ships sent to block the Greeks from escaping
 The retreat of the Greek fleet after word of a defeat at Thermopylae
 The supernatural rescue of Delphi from a Persian attack
 The evacuation of Athens assisted by the fleet
 The reinforcement of the Greek fleet at Salamis Island, bringing the total ships to 378
 The destruction of Athens by the Persian land force after difficulties with those who remained
 The Battle of Salamis, the Greeks have the advantage due to better organization, and fewer losses due to ability to swim
 The description of the Angarum, the Persian riding post
 The rise in favor of Artemisia, the Persian woman commander, and her council to Xerxes in favor of returning to Persia

 The vengeance of Hermotimus, Xerxes' chief eunuch, against Panionius
 The attack on Andros by Themistocles, the Athenian fleet commander and most valiant Greek at Salamis
 The escape of Xerxes and leaving behind of 300,000 picked troops under Mardonius in Thessaly
 The ancestry of Alexander I of Macedon, including Perdiccas
 The refusal of an attempt by Alexander to seek a Persian alliance with Athens

Book IX (Calliope) 
 The second taking of an evacuated Athens
 The evacuation to Thebes by Mardonius after the sending of Lacedaemonian troops
 The slaying of Masistius, leader of the Persian cavalry, by the Athenians
 The warning from Alexander to the Greeks of an impending attack
 The death of Mardonius by Aeimnestus
 The Persian retreat to Thebes where they are afterwards slaughtered (Battle of Plataea)
 The description and dividing of the spoils
 The speedy escape of Artabazus into Asia.
 The Persian defeat in Ionia by the Greek fleet (Battle of Mycale), and the Ionian revolt
 The mutilation of the wife of Masistes ordered by Amestris, wife of Xerxes
 The death of Masistes after his intent to rebel
 The Athenian blockade of Sestos and the capture of Artayctes
 The Persians' abortive suggestion to Cyrus to migrate from rocky Persis

Style
In his introduction to Hecataeus' work, Genealogies:

This points forward to the "folksy" yet "international" outlook typical of Herodotus. However, one modern scholar has described the work of Hecataeus as "a curious false start to history," since despite his critical spirit, he failed to liberate history from myth. Herodotus mentions Hecataeus in his Histories, on one occasion mocking him for his naive genealogy and, on another occasion, quoting Athenian complaints against his handling of their national history. It is possible that Herodotus borrowed much material from Hecataeus, as stated by Porphyry in a quote recorded by Eusebius. In particular, it is possible that he copied descriptions of the crocodile, hippopotamus, and phoenix from Hecataeus's Circumnavigation of the Known World (Periegesis / Periodos ges), even misrepresenting the source as "Heliopolitans" (Histories 2.73).

But Hecataeus did not record events that had occurred in living memory, unlike Herodotus, nor did he include the oral traditions of Greek history within the larger framework of oriental history. There is no proof that Herodotus derived the ambitious scope of his own work, with its grand theme of civilizations in conflict, from any predecessor, despite much scholarly speculation about this in modern times. Herodotus claims to be better informed than his predecessors by relying on empirical observation to correct their excessive schematism. For example, he argues for continental asymmetry as opposed to the older theory of a perfectly circular earth with Europe and Asia/Africa equal in size (Histories 4.36 and 4.42). However, he retains idealizing tendencies, as in his symmetrical notions of the Danube and Nile.

His debt to previous authors of prose "histories" might be questionable, but there is no doubt that Herodotus owed much to the example and inspiration of poets and story-tellers. For example, Athenian tragic poets provided him with a world-view of a balance between conflicting forces, upset by the hubris of kings, and they provided his narrative with a model of episodic structure. His familiarity with Athenian tragedy is demonstrated in a number of passages echoing Aeschylus's Persae, including the epigrammatic observation that the defeat of the Persian navy at Salamis caused the defeat of the land army (Histories 8.68 ~ Persae 728). The debt may have been repaid by Sophocles because there appear to be echoes of The Histories in his plays, especially a passage in Antigone that resembles Herodotus's account of the death of Intaphernes (Histories 3.119 ~ Antigone 904–920). However, this point is one of the most contentious issues in modern scholarship.

Homer was another inspirational source. Just as Homer drew extensively on a tradition of oral poetry, sung by wandering minstrels, so Herodotus appears to have drawn on an Ionian tradition of story-telling, collecting and interpreting the oral histories he chanced upon in his travels. These oral histories often contained folk-tale motifs and demonstrated a moral, yet they also contained substantial facts relating to geography, anthropology, and history, all compiled by Herodotus in an entertaining style and format.

Mode of explanation 
Herodotus writes with the purpose of explaining; that is, he discusses the reason for or cause of an event. He lays this out in the preamble: "This is the publication of the research of Herodotus of Halicarnassus, so that the actions of people shall not fade with time, so that the great and admirable achievements of both Greeks and barbarians shall not go unrenowned, and, among other things, to set forth the reasons why they waged war on each other."

This mode of explanation traces itself all the way back to Homer, who opened the Iliad by asking:

Which of the immortals set these two at each other's throats?
Zeus' son and Leto's, offended
by the warlord. Agamemnon had dishonored
Chryses, Apollo's priest, so the god
struck the Greek camp with plague,
and the soldiers were dying of it.

Both Homer and Herodotus begin with a question of causality. In Homer's case, "who set these two at each other's throats?" In Herodotus's case, "Why did the Greeks and barbarians go to war with each other?"

Herodotus's means of explanation does not necessarily posit a simple cause; rather, his explanations cover a host of potential causes and emotions. It is notable, however, that "the obligations of gratitude and revenge are the fundamental human motives for Herodotus, just as ... they are the primary stimulus to the generation of narrative itself."

Some readers of Herodotus believe that his habit of tying events back to personal motives signifies an inability to see broader and more abstract reasons for action. Gould argues to the contrary that this is likely because Herodotus attempts to provide the rational reasons, as understood by his contemporaries, rather than providing more abstract reasons.

Types of causality 
Herodotus attributes cause to both divine and human agents. These are not perceived as mutually exclusive, but rather mutually interconnected. This is true of Greek thinking in general, at least from Homer onward. Gould notes that invoking the supernatural in order to explain an event does not answer the question "why did this happen?" but rather "why did this happen to me?" By way of example, faulty craftsmanship is the human cause for a house collapsing. However, divine will is the reason that the house collapses at the particular moment when I am inside. It was the will of the gods that the house collapsed while a particular individual was within it, whereas it was the cause of man that the house had a weak structure and was prone to falling.

Some authors, including Geoffrey de Ste-Croix and Mabel Lang, have argued that Fate, or the belief that "this is how it had to be," is Herodotus's ultimate understanding of causality. Herodotus's explanation that an event "was going to happen" maps well on to Aristotelean and Homeric means of expression. The idea of "it was going to happen" reveals a "tragic discovery" associated with fifth-century drama. This tragic discovery can be seen in Homer's Iliad as well.

John Gould argues that Herodotus should be understood as falling in a long line of story-tellers, rather than thinking of his means of explanation as a "philosophy of history" or "simple causality." Thus, according to Gould, Herodotus's means of explanation is a mode of story-telling and narration that has been passed down from generations prior:

Reliability

The accuracy of the works of Herodotus has been controversial since his own era. Kenton L. Sparks writes, "In antiquity, Herodotus had acquired the reputation of being unreliable, biased, parsimonious in his praise of heroes, and mendacious". The historian Duris of Samos called Herodotus a "myth-monger". Cicero (On the Laws I.5) said that his works were full of legends or "fables". The controversy was also commented on by Aristotle, Flavius Josephus and Plutarch. The Alexandrian grammarian Harpocration wrote a whole book on "the lies of Herodotus". Lucian of Samosata went as far as to deny the "father of history" a place among the famous on the Island of the Blessed in his Verae Historiae.

The works of Thucydides were often given preference for their "truthfulness and reliability", even if Thucydides basically continued on foundations laid by Herodotus, as in his treatment of the Persian Wars. In spite of these lines of criticism, Herodotus' works were in general kept in high esteem and regarded as reliable by many. Many scholars, ancient and modern (such as Strabo, A. H. L. Heeren, etc.), routinely cited Herodotus.

To this day, some scholars regard his works as being at least partly unreliable. Detlev Fehling writes of "a problem recognized by everybody", namely that Herodotus frequently cannot be taken at face value. Fehling argues that Herodotus exaggerated the extent of his travels and invented his sources. For Fehling, the sources of many stories, as reported by Herodotus, do not appear credible in themselves. Persian and Egyptian informants tell stories that dovetail neatly into Greek myths and literature, yet show no signs of knowing their own traditions. For Fehling, the only credible explanation is that Herodotus invented these sources, and that the stories themselves were concocted by Herodotus himself.

Like many ancient historians, Herodotus preferred an element of show to purely analytic history, aiming to give pleasure with "exciting events, great dramas, bizarre exotica." As such, certain passages have been the subject of controversy and even some doubt, both in antiquity and today.

Despite the controversy, Herodotus has long served and still serves as the primary, often only, source for events in the Greek world, Persian Empire, and the broader region in the two centuries leading up to his own days. So even if the Histories were criticized in some regards since antiquity, modern historians and philosophers generally take a more positive view as to their source and epistemologic value. Herodotus is variously considered "father of comparative anthropology," "the father of ethnography," and "more modern than any other ancient historian in his approach to the ideal of total history."

Discoveries made since the end of the 19th century have generally added to Herodotus' credibility. He described Gelonus, located in Scythia, as a city thousands of times larger than Troy; this was widely disbelieved until it was rediscovered in 1975. The archaeological study of the now-submerged ancient Egyptian city of Heracleion and the recovery of the so-called "Naucratis stela" give credibility to Herodotus's previously unsupported claim that Heracleion was founded during the Egyptian New Kingdom.

Babylon

Herodotus claimed to have visited Babylon. The absence of any mention of the Hanging Gardens of Babylon in his work has attracted further attacks on his credibility. In response, Dalley has proposed that the Hanging Gardens may have been in Nineveh rather than in Babylon.

Egypt
The reliability of Herodotus's writing about Egypt is sometimes questioned. Alan B. Lloyd argues that, as a historical document, the writings of Herodotus are seriously defective, and that he was working from "inadequate sources." Nielsen writes: "Though we cannot entirely rule out the possibility of Herodotus having been in Egypt, it must be said that his narrative bears little witness to it." German historian Detlev Fehling questions whether Herodotus ever traveled up the Nile River, and considers doubtful almost everything that he says about Egypt and Ethiopia. Fehling states that "there is not the slightest bit of history behind the whole story" about the claim of Herodotus that Pharaoh Sesostris campaigned in Europe, and that he left a colony in Colchia. Fehling concludes that the works of Herodotus are intended as fiction. Boedeker concurs that much of the content of the works of Herodotus are literary devices.

However, a recent discovery of a baris (described in The Histories) during an excavation of the sunken Egyptian port city of Thonis-Heracleion lends credence to Herodotus's travels and storytelling.

Herodotus' contribution to the history and ethnography of ancient Egypt and Africa was especially valued by various historians of the field (such as Constantin François de Chassebœuf, comte de Volney, W. E. B. Du Bois, Pierre Montet, Martin Bernal, Basil Davidson, Derek A. Welsby, Henry T. Aubin). Many scholars explicitly mention the reliability of Herodotus's work (such as on the Nile Valley) and demonstrate corroboration of Herodotus' writings by modern scholars. A. H. L. Heeren quoted Herodotus throughout his work and provided corroboration by scholars regarding several passages (source of the Nile, location of Meroë, etc.). 

Cheikh Anta Diop provides several examples (like the inundations of the Nile) which, he argues, support his view that Herodotus was "quite scrupulous, objective, scientific for his time." Diop argues that Herodotus "always distinguishes carefully between what he has seen and what he has been told." Diop also notes that Strabo corroborated Herodotus' ideas about the Black Egyptians, Ethiopians, and Colchians. Martin Bernal has relied on Herodotus "to an extraordinary degree" in his controversial book Black Athena.

British egyptologist Derek A. Welsby said that "archaeology graphically confirms Herodotus's observations." To further his work on the Egyptians and Assyrians, historian and fiction writer Henry T. Aubin used Herodotus' accounts in various passages. For Aubin, Herodotus was "the author of the first important narrative history of the world."

Scientific reasoning
 On geography
Herodotus provides much information about the nature of the world and the status of science during his lifetime, often engaging in private speculation likewise. For example, he reports that the annual flooding of the Nile was said to be the result of melting snows far to the south, and he comments that he cannot understand how there can be snow in Africa, the hottest part of the known world, offering an elaborate explanation based on the way that desert winds affect the passage of the Sun over this part of the world (2:18ff). He also passes on reports from Phoenician sailors that, while circumnavigating Africa, they "saw the sun on the right side while sailing westwards", although, being unaware of the existence of the southern hemisphere, he says that he does not believe the claim. Owing to this brief mention, which is included almost as an afterthought, it has been argued that Africa was circumnavigated by ancient seafarers, for this is precisely where the sun ought to have been. His accounts of India are among the oldest records of Indian civilization by an outsider.

 On biology

After journeys to India and Pakistan, French ethnologist Michel Peissel claimed to have discovered an animal species that may illuminate one of the most bizarre passages in the Histories. In Book 3, passages 102 to 105, Herodotus reports that a species of fox-sized, furry "ants" lives in one of the far eastern, Indian provinces of the Persian Empire. This region, he reports, is a sandy desert, and the sand there contains a wealth of fine gold dust. These giant ants, according to Herodotus, would often unearth the gold dust when digging their mounds and tunnels, and the people living in this province would then collect the precious dust. Later Pliny the Elder would mention this story in the gold mining section of his Naturalis Historia.

 

Peissel reports that, in an isolated region of northern Pakistan on the Deosai Plateau in Gilgit–Baltistan province, there is a species of marmot – the Himalayan marmot, a type of burrowing squirrel – that may have been what Herodotus called giant ants. The ground of the Deosai Plateau is rich in gold dust, much like the province that Herodotus describes. According to Peissel, he interviewed the Minaro tribal people who live in the Deosai Plateau, and they have confirmed that they have, for generations, been collecting the gold dust that the marmots bring to the surface when they are digging their burrows.

Peissel offers the theory that Herodotus may have confused the old Persian word for "marmot" with the word for "mountain ant." Research suggests that Herodotus probably did not know any Persian (or any other language except his native Greek) and was forced to rely on many local translators when travelling in the vast multilingual Persian Empire. Herodotus did not claim to have personally seen the creatures which he described. Herodotus did, though, follow up in passage 105 of Book 3 with the claim that the "ants" are said to chase and devour full-grown camels.

Accusations of bias
Some "calumnious fictions" were written about Herodotus in a work titled On the Malice of Herodotus by Plutarch, a Chaeronean by birth, (or it might have been a Pseudo-Plutarch, in this case "a great collector of slanders"), including the allegation that the historian was prejudiced against Thebes because the authorities there had denied him permission to set up a school. Similarly, in a Corinthian Oration, Dio Chrysostom (or yet another pseudonymous author) accused the historian of prejudice against Corinth, sourcing it in personal bitterness over financial disappointments – an account also given by Marcellinus in his Life of Thucydides. In fact, Herodotus was in the habit of seeking out information from empowered sources within communities, such as aristocrats and priests, and this also occurred at an international level, with Periclean Athens becoming his principal source of information about events in Greece. As a result, his reports about Greek events are often coloured by Athenian bias against rival states – Thebes and Corinth in particular.

Use of sources and sense of authority 

It is clear from the beginning of Book 1 of the Histories that Herodotus utilizes (or at least claims to utilize) various sources in his narrative. K. H. Waters relates that "Herodotos did not work from a purely Hellenic standpoint; he was accused by the patriotic but somewhat imperceptive Plutarch of being philobarbaros, a pro-barbarian or pro-foreigner."

Herodotus at times relates various accounts of the same story. For example, in Book 1 he mentions both the Phoenician and the Persian accounts of Io. However, Herodotus at times arbitrates between varying accounts: "I am not going to say that these events happened one way or the other. Rather, I will point out the man who I know for a fact began the wrong-doing against the Greeks." Again, later, Herodotus claims himself as an authority: "I know this is how it happened because I heard it from the Delphians myself."

Throughout his work, Herodotus attempts to explain the actions of people. Speaking about Solon the Athenian, Herodotus states "[Solon] sailed away on the pretext of seeing the world, but it was really so that he could not be compelled to repeal any of the laws he had laid down." Again, in the story about Croesus and his son's death, when speaking of Adrastus (the man who accidentally killed Croesus' son), Herodotus states: "Adrastus ... believing himself to be the most ill-fated man he had ever known, cut his own throat over the grave."

Herodotus and myth
Although Herodotus considered his "inquiries" a serious pursuit of knowledge, he was not above relating entertaining tales derived from the collective body of myth, but he did so judiciously with regard for his historical method, by corroborating the stories through enquiry and testing their probability. While the gods never make personal appearances in his account of human events, Herodotus states emphatically that "many things prove to me that the gods take part in the affairs of man" (IX, 100).

In Book One, passages 23 and 24, Herodotus relates the story of Arion, the renowned harp player, "second to no man living at that time," who was saved by a dolphin. Herodotus prefaces the story by noting that "a very wonderful thing is said to have happened," and alleges its veracity by adding that the "Corinthians and the Lesbians agree in their account of the matter." Having become very rich while at the court of Periander, Arion conceived a desire to sail to Italy and Sicily. He hired a vessel crewed by Corinthians, whom he felt he could trust, but the sailors plotted to throw him overboard and seize his wealth. Arion discovered the plot and begged for his life, but the crew gave him two options: that either he kill himself on the spot or jump ship and fend for himself in the sea. Arion flung himself into the water, and a dolphin carried him to shore.

Herodotus clearly writes as both historian and teller of tales. Herodotus takes a fluid position between the artistic story-weaving of Homer and the rational data-accounting of later historians. John Herington has developed a helpful metaphor for describing Herodotus's dynamic position in the history of Western art and thought – Herodotus as centaur:

Herodotus is neither a mere gatherer of data nor a simple teller of tales – he is both. While Herodotus is certainly concerned with giving accurate accounts of events, this does not preclude for him the insertion of powerful mythological elements into his narrative, elements which will aid him in expressing the truth of matters under his study. Thus to understand what Herodotus is doing in the Histories, we must not impose strict demarcations between the man as mythologist and the man as historian, or between the work as myth and the work as history. As James Romm has written, Herodotus worked under a common ancient Greek cultural assumption that the way events are remembered and retold (e.g. in myths or legends) produces a valid kind of understanding, even when this retelling is not entirely factual. For Herodotus, then, it takes both myth and history to produce truthful understanding.

Legacy 
On the legacy of The Histories of Herodotus, historian Barry S. Strauss writes:

In popular culture 
Historical novels sourcing material from Herodotus

Critical editions

Translations

Manuscripts 
 Papyrus Oxyrhynchus 18
 Papyrus Oxyrhynchus 19
 Papyrus Oxyrhynchus 2099, early 2nd century CE – fragment of Book VIII

See also

Notes

References

Sources

External links 

  — Complete online text 
  — Searchable textfile 

  — Complete online text 

 

 

 

 

  Direct link to PDF 

5th-century BC history books
Books about civilizations
 
Greco-Roman ethnography
Texts in Ionic Greek
History books about the Greco-Persian Wars